The Teacher is a 1977 Cuban drama film directed by Octavio Cortázar. The film, set in the early years of the Cuban Revolution, tells the story of a young urban teacher going to poor, rural areas to teach peasants how to read and write. He must overcome the initial resistance of some inhabitants due to his youth, get used to a totally unknown environment and confront the bandits who support the mercenary invasion. The screenplay was written by Luis Rogelio Nogueras and Octavio Cortázar. The film was produced by the Instituto Cubano del Arte e Industrias Cinematográficos. It was entered into the 28th Berlin International Film Festival, where it won the Silver Bear for outstanding artistic contribution.

Cast
 René de la Cruz
 Javier González
 Adela Legrá
 Luis Rielo
 Maribel Rodríguez
 Patricio Wood
 Salvador Wood

See also 
 List of Cuban films

References

External links

1977 films
1970s Spanish-language films
1977 drama films
Films directed by Octavio Cortázar
Silver Bear for outstanding artistic contribution
Cuban drama films